The following list indicates the best-selling albums from 1970 to 1979 on the Japanese Oricon chart. It is based on cumulative sales figures of two formats (on vinyl, and audio cassette).

Albums

References

Japan
1970s in Japanese music
Japanese music-related lists